The Wenona Girl Quality is an Australian Turf Club Group 3 Thoroughbred quality handicap horse race, for mares aged four-years-old and upwards, over a distance of 1200 metres at Randwick Racecourse in Sydney, Australia in March.  Total prize money for the race is A$160,000.

History
The race is named after champion Australian Racing Hall of Fame mare Wenona Girl, who won 27 races in the late 1950s and early 1960s. At the time of her retirement she was the highest stakes winning mare to have raced in Australia.

In 2014 the race was named after champion jockey Roy Higgins (1938–2014), who had died early in the week of the scheduled race.

Name
 2006–2013 - Wenona Girl Quality Handicap
2014 - Roy Higgins Tribute Quality
2015-16 - Wenona Girl Handicap
2017 - Wenona Girl Quality

Grade
2006–2013 - Listed race
2014 onwards - Group 3

Venue
2006–2010 - Randwick Racecourse
 2011 - Warwick Farm Racecourse
 2012 - Randwick Racecourse
 2013 - Warwick Farm Racecourse
 2014 onwards - Randwick Racecourse

Winners

 2022 - Belluci Babe 
 2021 - Vulpine
2020 - Fasika
2019 - Winter Bride
2018 - Sugar Bella
2017 - Rocket Commander
2016 - Savoureux
2015 - Griante
2014 - A Time For Julia 
2013 - Arinosa
2012 - Rose Of Peace
2011 - Ofcourseican
2010 - Beaded
2009 - Belong To Many
2008 - Litter
2007 - Kakakakatie
2006 - Wonderer

See also
 List of Australian Group races
 Group races

External links
 First three place getters Wenona Girl Quality (ATC)

References

Horse races in Australia